The Episcopal Diocese of California is an ecclesiastical territory or diocese of the Episcopal Church in the United States of America (ECUSA) in Northern California.

History
The founding Episcopal diocese in the state, once encompassing all of California, today the diocese comprises Alameda, Contra Costa, Marin, San Francisco, and San Mateo Counties, and the cities of Los Altos and part of Palo Alto in Santa Clara County, in the San Francisco Bay Area.  The see city is San Francisco, California and the diocesan cathedral is Grace Cathedral on top of Nob Hill. The primary convention of the Missionary District of California met at Trinity Church in San Francisco on June 24, 1850. The diocese was then established on February 5, 1857 when the first diocesan bishop was elected. 

The eighth and current bishop of California is Marc Andrus, formerly suffragan bishop of Alabama, who was invested with the office on July 22, 2006, succeeding William E. Swing.

2006 bishop election controversy
In October 2004, Swing announced his retirement at the diocesan convention.  By early 2006, after a search process, a slate of seven finalists were presented to the diocese as candidates to succeed him. Among the seven finalists were a lesbian and two gay men in long-term relationships with their partners.  None of the seven candidates on the ballot had made an affirmation to the Church that their relationship was celibate. Resolution 1.10 of the 1998 Lambeth Conference, a consultative body of the wider Anglican Communion without jurisdictional authority for any national Church, had declared abstinence to be "right" for those not called to heterosexual marriage.

This election became widely watched by many in the Anglican Communion.  Some feared that the elevation of a second gay bishop would cause a schism between the ECUSA and the rest of the Anglican Communion.

Marc Andrus, Suffragan Bishop of Alabama was elected on the third ballot with the openly homosexual candidates receiving only a few votes.  His election was confirmed at the General Convention of the Episcopal Church in June 2006. He was installed as the eighth Bishop of California on July 22, 2006, at Grace Cathedral, San Francisco.

Affiliated Schools
The diocese operates The Episcopal School for Deacons as a college for training deacons.  The school is located on the grounds of the Church Divinity School of the Pacific in Berkeley, California, two blocks to the north of the University of California, Berkeley.

List of diocesan Bishops of California

List of suffragan and assistant bishops

References

External links
Episcopal Diocese of California website
Journal of the Annual Convention, Diocese of California

California
Diocese of California
Religious organizations established in 1853
Anglican dioceses established in the 19th century
1853 establishments in California
Province 8 of the Episcopal Church (United States)